The UiS Business School (In Norwegian: Handelshøyskolen ved UiS) is a business school situated in Stavanger, Norway, and a faculty under the University of Stavanger. The business school is one of the largest institutions in Norway educating students at the masters level in business administration.

History
The origin for the UiS Business School was the establishment of the Rogaland Regional College in Stavanger in 1969 with a two-year program in Business Administration. The regional College became the University College of Rogaland in 1985 and in 1995 changed the name to Høgskolen i Stavanger/Stavanger University College (HiS). The University of Stavanger UiS was established in 2005 when the former Høgskolen i Stavanger (HiS) received university status.

Staff & Students
The UiS Business School consists of about 75 faculty members and staff, 750 undergraduate students, 300 graduate students, 100 Executive MBA students, and 22 PhD candidates.

Research centers and Research groups
 Centre for Innovation Research and Center for Entrepreneurship
 Energy and Commodity Finance Research group
 Behavioural Economics and Finance Research group
 Lemon lab
 Capital markets accounting research

Educational Programmes
The UiS Business School offer Bachelor Programmes in Business Administration, Accounting & Auditing, and Law and Master of Science Programmes in Applied Finance, Accounting and Auditing. In addition, the UIS Business School also offers an Executive MBA programme.

Notable faculty and alumni

Academics
 Mari Rege
 Ola Kvaløy
 Klaus Mohn
 Ragnar Tveterås
 Rune Dahl Fitjar
 Tom Broekel
 Marte Cecilie Wilhelmsen Solheim
 Kenneth Henning Wathne
 Bjørn Terje Åsheim
 Benn Folkvord
 Bård Misund
 Tatiana Iakovleva
 Bernt Arne Ødegaard
 Aslaug Mikkelsen

References

External links
 Official website

Research institutes in Norway
University of Stavanger